Rice Thomas Hopkins Gemmell (1896–1972) was an Australian tennis player.

Born in Caulfield, Victoria, by 1916 he was living in Claremont, Western Australia and was enlisted in World War 1 as a bombardier. Gemmell is best known for winning the 1921 Australasian Championships men's singles title, held at Perth, where he beat Alf Hedeman in the final. In the same year, he also won the men's doubles title, partnering Stanley Eaton. Gemmell was Western Australia's top player during the 1920s. In 1924 Gemmell opened a store which sold sports equipment with fellow player Keith McDougall. Gemmell turned professional in 1927. In 1932 he became a gold miner and in 1940 he survived a car crash in which the driver of the car died. He died in 1972 and is interred in Tewantin, Queensland.

Grand Slam finals

Singles (1)

Winner (1)

Doubles (1)

Winner (1)

References

1896 births
1972 deaths
Australasian Championships (tennis) champions
Australian male tennis players
Tennis players from Melbourne
Grand Slam (tennis) champions in men's doubles
Grand Slam (tennis) champions in men's singles
20th-century Australian people
People from Caulfield, Victoria
Tennis players from Perth, Western Australia
Military personnel from Western Australia
Australian military personnel of World War I